A leadership election was held by the Democratic Action Party (DAP) of Malaysia on 29 September 2013.

Central Executive Committee election results

References

2013 elections in Malaysia
Democratic Action Party leadership election
Democratic Action Party leadership elections